Hana Holišová (born 6 August 1980) is a Czech actress and singer. At the 2012 Thalia Awards she won the category of Best Actress in a Musical.

Biography 
Holišová studied at the Janáček Academy of Music and Performing Arts in Brno. She went on to perform in theatres such as Brno City Theatre, National Theatre Brno, and Divadlo Bolka Polívky (all in Brno), Musical Theatre Karlín and Divadlo pod Palmovkou (both in Prague) and New Scene (Bratislava). She took part in, and won, the 2016 series of Tvoje tvář má známý hlas.

Selected filmography 
Velmi křehké vztahy (television, 2007–2009)
Ulice (television, 2014–present)

References

External links

1980 births
Living people
Czech film actresses
Czech stage actresses
Actors from Brno
Janáček Academy of Music and Performing Arts alumni
21st-century Czech actresses
Recipients of the Thalia Award